Evelyn Charles Warburton Gamble (16 December 1882 – 27 August 1945) was a British stage and film actor. 

Gamble was born on 16 December 1882 in London and acted on stage professionally as early as 1905. His work on stage included a season of acting with the Theater Guild Repertory Company in San Francisco. He debuted on Broadway in Love and the Man (1905) and last performed on Broadway in Tonight or Never (1930).

Gamble's film debut occurred in The Unforseen (1917). He spent a number of years working in Hollywood during the silent and early sound eras. He played the role of Doctor Watson in the 1933 Sherlock Holmes film A Study in Scarlet. His final two films were at Ealing Studios.

Gamble was married to English actress Gillian Scaife. He died on 27 August 1945 in London.

Filmography

Bibliography
 Hardy, Phil. The BFI Companion to Crime. University of California Press, 1997.

References

External links

 Warburton Gamble (striped pants) in the 1915 Broadway play Outcast with costars Charles Cherry, Elsie Ferguson, and J. Woodall Birde (University of Washington, Sayre Digital Collection)

1882 births
1945 deaths
English male film actors
English male silent film actors
English male stage actors
Male actors from London
20th-century English male actors